The following is a list of gay, lesbian, bisexual and/or transgender individuals who have been elected as members of the House of Commons of the United Kingdom, European Union, other devolved parliaments and assemblies of the United Kingdom, parliaments of the countries that preceded the United Kingdom and also members of the non-elected House of Lords.

Following the 2019 general election, the UK parliament has the largest number of self-identified LGBT members of any national legislature worldwide.

List of LGBT members of the Cabinet in the House of Commons

List of LGBT ministers in the House of Commons

List of LGBT members of the House of Commons

List of LGBT members of the Cabinet in the House of Lords

List of LGBT ministers in the House of Lords

List of LGBT members of the House of Lords

List of LGBT members of the European Parliament

List of LGBT members of the Scottish Parliament

List of LGBT members of the Welsh Parliament

List of LGBT members of the Northern Ireland Assembly

List of LGBT members of the London Assembly

List of LGBT police and crime commissioners

List of LGBT directly elected mayors

See also 
 List of the first LGBT holders of political offices in the United Kingdom

References 

L
L

United Kingdom